221 (two hundred [and] twenty-one) is the natural number following 220 and preceding 222.

In mathematics
Its factorization as 13 × 17 makes 221 the product of two consecutive prime numbers, the sixth smallest such product.

221 is a centered square number.

In other fields
In Texas hold 'em, the probability of being dealt pocket aces (the strongest possible outcome in the initial deal of two cards per player) is 1/221.

Sherlock Holmes's home address: 221B Baker Street.

References

Integers